Islamabad is served by two district courts. Appeals from these courts are heard in Islamabad High Court. The Court currently sits in F-11, while separate Judicial Complex buildings are under plan.

History 
From 1980 to 2011, District Judiciary was under the control of supervision of Lahore High Court, Lahore. Under the 18th amendment of the Constitution, the Islamabad High Court was established and it was also given the supervision over District Judiciary Islamabad.

In 2012, two Judicial districts were divided into East and West:

Islamabad West 
 All sectors of Islamabad
 Union council Shah Allah Ditta, Saidpur, and Noorpur Shahan.

Islamabad East 

 11 Union Councils: Rawat, Sihala, Koral, Tarlai, Bharakahu, Kirpa, Chirah, Sohan, Kurri, Tumair, and Phulgran
 The villages Ojri and Malpur.

See also 
 Islamabad High Court
 District courts of Pakistan
 Capital Development Authority

References

External links
 Islamabad High Court
 District Court West
 District Court East

Islamabad Capital Territory
District Courts of Pakistan